Tracholena micropolia is a species of moth of the family Tortricidae. It is found in Australia, where it has been recorded from Queensland.

The wingspan is about 12 mm. The forewings are whitish grey, strigulated (finely streaked) with pale fuscous. The hindwings are whitish, tinged with grey towards the apex.

References

Moths described in 1910
Schoenotenini